Allophylus rhoidiphyllus is a species of plant in the family Sapindaceae. It is endemic to Yemen.

References

Endemic flora of Socotra
rhoidiphyllus
Near threatened plants
Taxonomy articles created by Polbot